Luchi or Lusi is a deep-fried flatbread, made of Maida flour, originating from the Bengal region. Luchi is especially popular in the Indian states of Assam, Odisha, West Bengal and Tripura and in the neighbouring country Bangladesh.

It is notably eaten with aloor dum or kosha mangsho.  Since Luchi does not involve rice or rice flour, it is a popular staple item at times when rice is to be avoided, as in case of ekadashi, for those who believe in the ritual, or similar instances. In such ritualistic instances, since the primary food needs to be vegetarian, Luchi is preferred with dum aloo or any similar vegetarian dish. In occasions where no such restriction is mandated, luchi and kosha mangsho is often a popular combination.

See also
 List of Indian breads
 Indian cuisine
 Bangladeshi cuisine

References

Bangladeshi cuisine
Bengali cuisine
Deep fried foods
Flatbreads
Indian breads
Odia cuisine